The 2009–10 season was Dunfermline Athletic's 3rd season in the Scottish First Division after being relegated from the Scottish Premier League in 2007.

Review and Events

Chronological list of events
This is a list of the significant events to occur at the club during the 2009–10 season, presented in chronological order. This list does not include transfers, which are listed in the transfers section below, or match results, which are in the results section.

4 July: Director Gordon McDougall leaves the Pars towards the end of July to increase his efforts helping stricken side Livingston.

League table

Match results

Friendlies

League

Scottish League Cup

Scottish Challenge Cup

Scottish Cup

Player stats
During the 2009–10 season, Dunfermline have used 21 different players on the pitch. The table below shows the number of appearances and goals scored by each player.

|}

Stats
Andy Kirk is the top scorer with six goals, with the team totalling fifteen goals so far. During the 2009–10 season, eight Pars players have received at least one caution and one player has received at least one dismissal. In total, the team have received eleven yellow cards and one red card.

Transfers

In
Having lost goalkeeper Paul Gallacher to St Mirren, Dunfermline signed former Gretna keeper Greg Fleming on a season long loan. Having been released from his contract with Aridrie in March 2009, Dunfermline snapped up Joe Cardle on a free transfer and in July signed Cardle's Airdrie team-mate Steven McDougall on a free transfer. The Pars also signed Chris Higgins and Neil McGregor from relegated side Clyde and Kilmarnock winger Willie Gibson was signed for a nominal fee. Defender Andy Dowie moved from Scottish First Division rivals Ross County on a free transfer.

Out
At the end of the 2008–09 season, the Pars decided to allow 3 of their most senior players to leave the club. Scott Wilson teamed up with former Dunfermline captain and manager of North Queensland Fury Ian Ferguson in Australia, Greg Shields moved to America to join USL First Division side Carolina RailHawks and captain Scott Thomson was released on a free transfer. Goalkeeper Paul Gallacher was allowed to move up a division to the SPL to join St Mirren for an undisclosed fee. Kevin Harper, Stuart Dearden, Calum Reidford and Iain Williamson were all released from their contracts.

See also
 2009–10 Scottish First Division
 2009–10 Scottish Cup
 2009–10 Scottish League Cup
 2009–10 in Scottish football

References

External links
 Official Site: 2009–10 fixtures
 BBC Sport – Club Stats
 Soccerbase – Results  | Squad stats  | Transfers

Dunfermline Athletic F.C. seasons
Dunfermline Athletic